Fly Island is a tiny uninhabited island in the Great Palm Island group. Along with nine of the other islands within the Palm Islands group, it falls under the local government area of the Aboriginal Shire of Palm Island.

The island was gazetted as an Aboriginal reserve on 20 September 1941, along with neighbouring small islands, with the intention of extending Palm Island Aboriginal Settlement, but it was never used as such.

The nearest island to the west is Pandora Reef.

See also

 List of islands of Australia

References 

Great Palm Island group
Uninhabited islands of Australia